The 1988 Mercedes Cup,  was a men's tennis tournament played on outdoor clay courts and held at the Tennis Club Weissenhof in Stuttgart, West Germany that was part of the 1988 Grand Prix circuit. It was the 11th edition of the tournament and was held from 11 July until 17 July 1988. Second-seeded Andre Agassi won the singles title.

Finals

Singles

 Andre Agassi defeated  Andrés Gómez, 6–4, 6–2
 It was Agassi's 4th singles title of the year and the 5th of his career.

Doubles

 Sergio Casal /  Emilio Sánchez defeated  Anders Järryd /  Michael Mortensen, 4–6, 6–3, 6–4

References

External links
 Official website 
 ATP tournament profile

Stuttgart Open
1988
1988 in German tennis
July 1988 sports events in Europe